David Dale (born 1948) is an Australian Walkley Award-winning author, journalist/travel writer, television commentator, lecturer, international correspondent, political reporter and radio broadcaster

Career
Dale graduated from Sydney University with an honours degree in psychology before pursuing journalism. He writes on travel, food and popular culture for The Sydney Morning Herald and The Age, does media commentary for the ABC and teaches Media at the University of New South Wales, Sydney.
Dale created the satire column "Stay in Touch" for The Sydney Morning Herald in 1981 and edited it for four years before being appointed the paper's New York correspondent in 1986. He wrote The Tribal Mind media column for 20 years. He won a Walkley Award in 1984 for a feature called The Italian Waiters Conspiracy. He has also served as a political reporter for The Australian, a sub-editor for General Practitioner (London), features editor of "The Sydney Morning Herald", editor of The Bulletin and broadcaster for ABC radio and 2GB Sydney.

Bibliography

External links 
David Dale's bio (agent's website)
The Tribal Mind, Dale's blog about Australian pop culture

1948 births
Australian freelance journalists
Australian travel writers
Living people
The Sydney Morning Herald people